"Pulsatron" is a song by Siobhan Fahey, originally released in February 2005 from her debut solo album, which was later released as her project's fourth studio album Songs from the Red Room. The single peaked at number 95 on the UK Singles Chart, marking Fahey and Shakespears Sister's last appearance on mainstream charts.

Track listing
CD single
"Pulsatron" (Vocal Mix) — 3:16
"Pulsatron" (Whitey Mix) — 4:42
"Pulsatron" (The Most Mix By Princess Julia And Luke Howard) — 6:39
"Pulsatron" (Hugo Nicholson Vocal Mix) — 3:15

Charts

References

2005 singles
British pop songs
Shakespears Sister songs
Songs written by Siobhan Fahey
2005 songs